Dirk Flock (born 23 May 1972) is a German former professional football player and now manager.

Honours
1. FC Kaiserslautern
 DFB-Pokal: 1995–96

Werder Bremen
 DFB-Pokal: 1998–99; runner-up 1999–2000
 DFB-Ligapokal: runner-up 1999

References

External links
 
 

1972 births
Living people
Association football midfielders
German footballers
German football managers
Stuttgarter Kickers players
1. FC Kaiserslautern players
SV Werder Bremen players
Arminia Bielefeld players
VfB Remscheid players
FC Gütersloh 2000 players
Bundesliga players
2. Bundesliga players
FC Gütersloh 2000 managers
Footballers from Cologne
West German footballers